Sehner-Ellicott-Von Hess House is a historic home located at 123 N. Prince Street, Lancaster, Pennsylvania. It was built about 1780 by George Sehner, and is a finely restored house built in the Georgian style of architecture. It was occupied by Andrew Ellicott (1754–1820), first United States Surveyor General, from 1801 to 1813. Ellicott helped prepare Captain Meriwether Lewis for his exploration of the Louisiana Purchase.

It was listed on the National Register of Historic Places in 1972. It is now the home of the Historic Preservation Trust of Lancaster County, and open to visitors.

References

Houses on the National Register of Historic Places in Pennsylvania
Georgian architecture in Pennsylvania
Houses completed in 1780
Houses in Lancaster, Pennsylvania
National Register of Historic Places in Lancaster, Pennsylvania